"The Beast" is a song by Australian singer songwriters Angus & Julia Stone. It was released in August 2007 as the lead single from the duo's debut studio album A Book Like This. The song peaked at number 40 on the ARIA Charts; becoming the duo's first charting single. The single was released in the United Kingdom in October 2007.

At the ARIA Music Awards of 2008, the song was nominated for Breakthrough Artist – Single.

Track listing

Charts

References

2007 songs
2007 singles
Angus & Julia Stone songs
Songs written by Julia Stone